Lajos Horváth (born 1872, date of death unknown) was a Hungarian fencer. He competed in the men's masters sabre event at the 1900 Summer Olympics.

References

External links
 

1872 births
Year of death missing
Hungarian male sabre fencers
Olympic fencers of Hungary
Fencers at the 1900 Summer Olympics
People from Alba County
Date of birth missing
Place of death missing